The 21st Century Tower is a 55-story skyscraper along the Sheikh Zayed Road in Dubai. When it was completed in 2003 it took the title of the world's tallest residential building, ultimately being surpassed by the Eureka Tower in Melbourne, Australia and the Q1 tower in Australia's Gold Coast.

See also
 List of tallest buildings in the United Arab Emirates
 List of tallest buildings in Dubai

References

External links
SkyscraperPage.com
Emporis

Residential buildings completed in 2003
Residential skyscrapers in Dubai
2003 establishments in the United Arab Emirates